The Israeli disengagement from Gaza was the unilateral dismantling in 2005 of the 21 Israeli settlements in the Gaza Strip and the evacuation of Israeli settlers and army from inside the Gaza Strip.

The disengagement was proposed in 2003 by Prime Minister Ariel Sharon, adopted by the government in June 2004, and approved by the Knesset in February 2005 as the Disengagement Plan Implementation Law. It was implemented in August 2005 and completed in September 2005. The settlers who refused to accept government compensation packages and voluntarily vacate their homes prior to the 15 August 2005 deadline were evicted by Israeli security forces over a period of several days. The eviction of all residents, demolition of the residential buildings and evacuation of associated security personnel from the Gaza Strip was completed by 12 September 2005. The eviction and dismantlement of the four settlements in the northern West Bank was completed ten days later. 8,000 Jewish settlers from the 21 settlements in the Gaza Strip were relocated. The settlers received an average of more than US$200,000 in compensation per family.

The United Nations, international human rights organizations and many legal scholars regard the Gaza Strip to still be under military occupation by Israel. This is disputed by Israel and other legal scholars. Following the withdrawal, Israel has continued to maintain direct control over Gaza's air and maritime space, and six of Gaza's seven land crossings, it maintains a no-go buffer zone within the territory, and controls the Palestinian population registry, and Gaza remains dependent on Israel for its water, electricity, telecommunications, and other utilities.

Rationale and development of the policy
In his book Sharon: The Life of a Leader, Israeli Prime Minister Ariel Sharon's son Gilad wrote that he gave his father the idea of the disengagement. Sharon had originally dubbed his unilateral disengagement plan, the "separation plan" or Tokhnit HaHafrada before realizing that, "separation sounded bad, particularly in English, because it evoked apartheid."

In a November 2003 interview, Ehud Olmert, Sharon's deputy leader, who had been “dropping unilateralist hints for two or three months”, explained his developing policy as follows:
There is no doubt in my mind that very soon the government of Israel is going to have to address the demographic issue with the utmost seriousness and resolve. This issue above all others will dictate the solution that we must adopt. In the absence of a negotiated agreement – and I do not believe in the realistic prospect of an agreement – we need to implement a unilateral alternative... More and more Palestinians are uninterested in a negotiated, two-state solution, because they want to change the essence of the conflict from an Algerian paradigm to a South African one. From a struggle against 'occupation,' in their parlance, to a struggle for one-man-one-vote. That is, of course, a much cleaner struggle, a much more popular struggle – and ultimately a much more powerful one. For us, it would mean the end of the Jewish state... the parameters of a unilateral solution are: To maximize the number of Jews; to minimize the number of Palestinians; not to withdraw to the 1967 border and not to divide Jerusalem... Twenty-three years ago, Moshe Dayan proposed unilateral autonomy. On the same wavelength, we may have to espouse unilateral separation... [it] would inevitably preclude a dialogue with the Palestinians for at least 25 years.

Sharon suggested his disengagement plan for the first time on December 18, 2003 at the Fourth Herzliya Conference. In his address to the Conference, Sharon stated that ″settlements which will be relocated are those which will not be included in the territory of the State of Israel in the framework of any possible future permanent agreement. At the same time, in the framework of the Disengagement Plan, Israel will strengthen its control over those same areas in the Land of Israel which will constitute an inseparable part of the State of Israel in any future agreement.″ It was at this time that he began to use the word "occupation". Bernard Avishai states that the Gaza withdrawal was designed to obviate rather than facilitate peace negotiations: Sharon enivisaged at the same time annexing Jerusalem, the Jordan Valley, and the major settlements like Ma'ale Adumim and Ariel which he had in the meantime developed, and thereby isolate Palestinians on the West Bank in territory that constituted less than half of what existed beyond the Green Line.

Sharon formally announced the plan in his April 14, 2004 letter to U.S. President George W. Bush, stating that "there exists no Palestinian partner with whom to advance peacefully toward a settlement".

On June 6, 2004, Sharon's government approved an amended disengagement plan, but with the reservation that the dismantling of each settlement should be voted separately. On October 11, at the opening of the Knesset winter session, Sharon outlined his plan to start legislation for the disengagement at the beginning of November, and on October 26, the Knesset gave its preliminary approval. On February 16, 2005, the Knesset finalized and approved the plan.

In October 2004, Prime Minister Ariel Sharon's senior adviser, Dov Weissglass, explained the meaning of Sharon's statement further:
The significance of the disengagement plan is the freezing of the peace process, and when you freeze that process, you prevent the establishment of a Palestinian state, and you prevent a discussion on the refugees, the borders and Jerusalem. Effectively, this whole package called the Palestinian state, with all that it entails, has been removed indefinitely from our agenda. And all this with authority and permission. All with a presidential blessing and the ratification of both houses of Congress.

That is exactly what happened. You know, the term `peace process' is a bundle of concepts and commitments. The peace process is the establishment of a Palestinian state with all the security risks that entails. The peace process is the evacuation of settlements, it's the return of refugees, it's the partition of Jerusalem. And all that has now been frozen.... what I effectively agreed to with the Americans was that part of the settlements would not be dealt with at all, and the rest will not be dealt with until the Palestinians turn into Finns. That is the significance of what we did.

Demographic concerns, the maintenance of a Jewish majority in Israeli-controlled areas, played a significant role in the development of the policy.

The rationale for the disengagement has been partly attributed to Arnon Soffer’s campaign regarding "the danger the Palestinian womb posed to Israeli democracy." Sharon mentioned the demographic rationale in a public address on August 15, 2005, the day of the disengagement, as follows: "It is no secret that, like many others, I had believed and hoped we could forever hold onto Netzarim and Kfar Darom. But the changing reality in the country, in the region, and the world, required of me a reassessment and change of positions. We cannot hold on to Gaza forever. More than a million Palestinians live there and double their number with each generation." At the same time, Shimon Peres, then Vice Prime Minister, stated in an interview that: “We are disengaging from Gaza because of demography”.

Continued control of Gaza was considered to pose an impossible dilemma with respect to Israel's ability to be a Jewish and democratic state in all the territories it controls.

Political approval process 

Failing to gain public support from senior ministers, Sharon agreed that the Likud party would hold a referendum on the plan in advance of a vote by the Israeli Cabinet. The referendum was held on May 2, 2004 and ended with 65% of the voters against the disengagement plan, despite some polls showing approximately 55% of Likud members supporting the plan before the referendum. Commentators and the press described the rejection of the plan as a blow to Sharon. Sharon himself announced that he accepted the Likud referendum results and would take time to consider his steps. He ordered Minister of Defense Shaul Mofaz to create an amended plan which Likud voters could accept.

On June 6, 2004, Sharon's government approved an amended disengagement plan, but with the reservation that the dismantling of each settlement should be voted separately. The plan was approved with a 14–7 majority but only after the National Union ministers and cabinet members Avigdor Liberman and Binyamin Elon were dismissed from the cabinet, and a compromise offer by Likud's cabinet member Tzipi Livni was achieved.

Following the approval of the plan, it was decided to close the Erez industrial zone and move its factories to cities and towns in Israel such as Ashkelon, Dimona, Yeruham, and Sderot. Ehud Olmert, then the Minister of Industry, Trade, and Labor, stated that the closing was part of Israel's plan to withdraw from the Gaza Strip.

As a result of the passing of the plan (in principle), two National Religious Party (NRP) ministers, Effi Eitam and Yitzhak Levi, resigned, leaving the government with a minority in the Knesset. Later, the entire faction quit after their calls to hold a national referendum were ignored.

Sharon's pushing through this plan alienated many of his supporters on the right and garnered him unusual support from the left-wing in Israel. The right believes that Sharon ignored the mandate he had been elected on, and instead adopted the platform of his Labor opponent, Amram Mitzna, who was overwhelmingly defeated when he campaigned on a disengagement plan of far smaller magnitude. At that time, Sharon referred to Gaza communities such as Netzarim as "no different than Tel Aviv", and said that they are of such strategic value that "the fate of Netzarim is the fate of Tel Aviv."

Many on both sides remained skeptical of his will to withdraw beyond Gaza and the northern West Bank. Sharon had a majority for the plan in the government but not within his party. This forced him to seek a National Unity government, which was established in January 2005. Opponents of the plan, and some ministers, such as Benjamin Netanyahu and former minister Natan Sharansky, called on Sharon to hold a national referendum to prove that he had a mandate, which he refused to do.

On September 14, the Israeli cabinet approved, by a 9–1 majority, plans to compensate settlers who left the Gaza Strip, with only the NRP's Zevulun Orlev opposing. The government's plan for compensation used a formula that based actual amounts on location, house size, and number of family members among other factors. Most families were expected to receive between US$200,000 and 300,000.

On October 11, at the opening of the Knesset winter session, Sharon outlined his plan to start legislation for the disengagement in the beginning of November. In a symbolic act, the Knesset voted 53–44 against Sharon's address: Labor voted against, while the National Religious Party and ten members of Likud refused to support Sharon in the vote.

On October 26, the Knesset gave preliminary approval for the plan with 67 for, 45 against, seven abstentions, and one member absent. Netanyahu and three other cabinet ministers from Sharon's ruling Likud government threatened to resign unless Sharon agreed to hold a national referendum on the plan within fourteen days.

On November 9, Netanyahu withdrew his resignation threat, saying "In this new situation [the death of Yasser Arafat], I decided to stay in the government". Following the vote fourteen days earlier, and Sharon's subsequent refusal to budge on the referendum issue, the three other cabinet ministers from the Likud party backed down from their threat within days.

On December 30, Sharon made a deal with the Labor Party to form a coalition, with Shimon Peres becoming Vice Premier, restoring the government's majority in the Knesset.

On February 16, 2005, the Knesset finalized and approved the plan with 59 in favor, 40 opposed, 5 abstaining. A proposed amendment to submit the plan to a referendum was rejected, 29–72.

On March 17, the Southern Command of the Israel Defense Forces issued a military order prohibiting Israeli citizens not living in the Gaza Strip settlements from taking up residence there.

On March 28, the Knesset again rejected a bill to delay the implementation of the disengagement plan by a vote of 72 to 39. The bill was introduced by a group of Likud MKs who wanted to force a referendum on the issue.

On August 7, Netanyahu resigned just prior to the cabinet ratification of the first phase of the disengagement plan by a vote of 17 to 5. Netanyahu blamed the Israeli government for moving "blindly along" with the disengagement by not taking into account the expected upsurge in terrorism.

On August 10, in his first speech before the Knesset following his resignation, Netanyahu spoke of the necessity for Knesset members to oppose the proposed disengagement.
"Only we in the Knesset are able to stop this evil. Everything that the Knesset has decided, it is also capable of changing. I am calling on all those who grasp the danger: Gather strength and do the right thing. I don't know if the entire move can be stopped, but it still might be stopped in its initial stages. [Don't] give [the Palestinians] guns, don't give them rockets, don't give them a sea port, and don't give them a huge base for terror."

On August 15, Sharon said that, while he had hoped Israel could keep the Gaza settlements forever, reality simply intervened. "It is out of strength and not weakness that we are taking this step", repeating his argument that the disengagement plan has given Israel the diplomatic initiative.

On August 31, the Knesset voted to withdraw from the Gaza-Egypt border and allow Egyptian deployment of border police along the demilitarized Egyptian side of the border, revising the previously stated intent to maintain Israeli control the border.

Description of the plan 
The Gaza Strip contained 21 civilian Israeli settlements and the area evacuated in the West Bank contained four, as follows:

Hermesh and Mevo Dotan in the northwestern West Bank were included in the original disengagement plans, but were dropped from the plans in March.

Sharon said that his plan was designed to improve Israel's security and international status in the absence of political negotiations to end the Israeli–Palestinian conflict. About nine thousand Israeli residents within Gaza were instructed to leave the area or face eviction by the night of Tuesday August 16, 2005.

Under the Revised Disengagement Plan adopted on June 6, 2004, the IDF was to have remained on the Gaza-Egypt border and could have engaged in further house demolitions to widen a 'buffer zone' there (Art 6). However, Israel later decided to leave the border area, which is now controlled by Egypt and the Palestinians, through the PNA. Israel will continue to control Gaza's coastline and airspace and reserves the right to undertake military operations when necessary. (Art 3.1). Egypt will control Gaza's Egyptian border. Israel will continue to provide Gaza with water, communication, electricity, and sewage networks.

The agreements brokered, according to Condoleezza Rice, stipulated that,
 For the first time since 1967, Palestinian authorities would have complete control over exits and entrances to their territory.
 That both parties to the agreement, Israel and Palestinians, would upgrade and expand crossings to facilitate the movement of people and goods between Israel, Gaza and the West Bank.
 Palestinians would be allowed the use of bus and truck convoys to move between Gaza and the West Bank.
 Obstacles to movement in the West Bank would be lifted.
 A Palestinian seaport was to be constructed on the Gaza littoral.
 A Palestinian airport was considered important by both sides, and the United States was encouraging Israel to entertain the idea that construction to that end was to be resumed.
Because the Palestinian Authority in Gaza did not believe it had sufficient control of the area at this time, foreign observers such as the International Committee of the Red Cross, Human Rights Watch and various legal experts have argued that the disengagement will not end Israel's legal responsibility as an occupying power in Gaza. Israel and Egypt have concluded an agreement under which Egypt can increase the number of police on its side of the border, while the IDF evacuates the Gazan side. The text of the agreement is not yet public.

Execution of the plan 

The disengagement began with Operation "Yad l'Achim" (Hebrew: מבצע יד לאחים, “Giving brothers a hand").

The aim of the operation was to give the Gush Katif settlers the option to leave voluntarily. IDF soldiers helped the settlers who chose to do so by packing their belongings and carrying them. During the operation, soldiers went into settlers' homes and presented them with removal decrees. In addition, the IDF arranged crews of social nurses, psychologists, and support to youths.

On April 8, 2005, Defense Minister Shaul Mofaz said that Israel should consider not demolishing the evacuated buildings in the Gaza Strip, with the exception of synagogues (due to fears of their potential desecration, which eventually did occur), since it would be more costly and time consuming. This contrasted with the original plan by the Prime Minister to demolish all vacated buildings.

On May 9, the beginning of the evacuation of settlements was officially postponed from July 20 until August 15, so as to not coincide with the Jewish period of The Three Weeks and the fast of Tisha B'Av, traditionally marking grief and destruction.

On July 13, Sharon signed the closure order of Gush Katif, making the area a closed military zone. From that point on, only residents who presented Israeli ID cards with their registered address in Gush Katif were permitted to enter. Permits for 24–48 hours were given to select visitors for a few weeks before the entire area was completely sealed off to non-residents. Despite this ban, opponents of the disengagement managed to sneak in by foot through fields and bare soil. Estimates range from a few hundred to a few thousand people for those there illegally at that time. At one point, Sharon contemplated deploying Israel Border Police (Magav) forces to remove non-residents, but decided against it, as the manpower requirement would have been too great.

At midnight between August 14 and 15, the Kissufim crossing was shut down, and the Gaza Strip became officially closed for entrance by Israelis. The evacuation by agreement continued after midnight of the August 17 for settlers who requested a time extension for packing their things. The Gush Katif Municipal Council threatened to unilaterally declare independence, citing the Gaza Strip's internationally disputed status and Halacha as a foundation. Meanwhile, on August 14,  proclaimed the independence of Shirat HaYam as "The Independent Jewish Authority in Gaza Beach", and submitted appeals for recognition to the United Nations and Red Cross.

On August 15, the evacuation commenced under the orders of Maj. Gen. Dan Harel of the Southern Command. At 8 a.m., a convoy of security forces entered Neve Dekalim and began evacuating residents. Although many settlers chose to leave peacefully, others were forcibly evicted, while some attempted to block buses and clashed with security forces. The evacuations of six settlements then commenced as 14,000 Israeli soldiers and police officers forcibly evicted settlers and "mistanenim" (infiltrators). They went house to house, ordering settlers to leave and breaking down the doors of those who did not. There were scenes of troops dragging screaming and sobbing families from houses and synagogues, but with less violence than expected. Some of the soldiers were also observed sobbing, and there were instances of soldiers joining settlers in prayer before evicting them. Some settlers lit their homes on fire as they evacuated so as to leave the Palestinians nothing. Settlers blocked roads, lit fires, and pleaded with soldiers to disobey orders. One West Bank settler set herself on fire in front of a Gaza checkpoint, and in Neve Dekalim, a group of fifteen American Orthodox Jews barricaded themselves in a basement and threatened to light themselves on fire.

Kfar Darom was next evacuated. Residents and their supporters strung up barbed wire fences around the area, and security forces cut their way in. Some 300 settlers barricaded themselves in the local synagogue, while another group barricaded themselves on the roof with barbed wire, and pelted security forces with various objects. Police removed them by force after negotiations failed, and there were injuries to both settlers and officers. On August 17, the settlement of Morag was evacuated by 200 police officers.

On August 18, Shirat HaYam was evacuated by military and police forces, after infiltrators had been removed and the settlement's speaker system was disabled after settlers used it to call on troops to disobey orders. Youth placed obstacles made of flammable materials and torched tires and garbage dumpsters. Fires spread to Palestinian areas, and IDF bulldozers were deployed to put them out. A number of people also barricaded themselves in the synagogue and public buildings and on a deserted rooftop. Aryeh Yitzhaki defended his home with an M16 rifle, and dozens of settlers barricaded themselves inside or on the roof of his home, with at least four of those on the rooftop being armed. A brief stand-off with security forces ensued, and snipers were deployed after Yitzhaki threatened to fire at troops. Security forces stormed the rooftop and arrested settlers without any violence. IDF and police forces evacuated the home after Yitzhaki surrendered weapons and ammunition belonging to his group, but were met with bags of paint and whitewash thrown by settlers, and Yitzhaki's wife and another right-wing activist initially refused to evacuate and lay on the ground holding their infants.

Bedouin citizens of Israel from the village of Dahaniya, situated in the no-man's land on the Israel-Gaza Strip border, were evacuated and resettled in Arad. The village had a long history of cooperation with Israel, and the residents, who were viewed in Gaza as traitors, had asked to be evacuated due to security concerns.

On August 19, The Guardian reported that some settlers had their children leave their homes with their hands up, or wearing a Star of David badge, to associate the actions of Israel with Nazi Germany and the Holocaust. Some protestors said that they would "not go like sheep to the slaughter", a phrase strongly associated with the Holocaust.  On August 22, Netzarim was evacuated by the Israeli military. This officially marked the end of the 38-year-long presence of Israeli settlers in the Gaza Strip, though the official handover was planned for several weeks later.

The evacuation of the settlers was completed by August 22, after which demolition crews razed 2,800 houses, community buildings and 26 synagogues. Two synagogues, whose construction allowed for them to be taken apart and reassembled, were dismantled and rebuilt in Israel. The demolition of the homes was completed on September 1, while the Shirat HaYam hotel was demolished later.

On August 28, the IDF began dismantling Gush Katif's 48-grave cemetery. All of the bodies were removed by special teams of soldiers supervised by the Military Rabbinate and reburied in locations of their families' choosing. In accordance with Jewish law, all soil touching the remains was also transferred, and the dead were given second funerals, with the families observing a one-day mourning period. All coffins were draped in the Israeli flag on the way to reburial. The transfer was completed on September 1.

The IDF also pulled out its forces in the Gaza Strip, and had withdrawn 95% of its military equipment by September 1. On September 7, the IDF announced that it planned to advance its full withdrawal from the Gaza Strip to September 12, pending cabinet approval. It was also announced that in the area evacuated in the West Bank the IDF planned to transfer all control (excluding building permits and anti-terrorism) to the PNA – the area will remain "Area C" (full Israeli control) de jure, but "Area A" (full PNA control) de facto.

When the disengagement began, Israel had not yet decided on whether or not to withdraw from the Philadelphi Route, a narrow strip of land serving as a buffer zone along the border between the Gaza Strip and Egypt. Although Sharon was initially opposed to withdrawing from the Philadelphi Route, he relented after legal advisers told him that it was impossible to declare Israel had fully withdrawn from the Gaza Strip so long as it controlled the border with Egypt. On August 28, the Israeli government approved the Philadelphi Accord, under which Egypt, which was prohibited from militarizing the Sinai without Israeli approval as per its peace treaty with Israel, was authorized to deploy 750 border guards equipped with heavy weaponry to the Philadelphi Route. The agreement was approved by the Knesset on August 31. On September 12, the IDF withdrew all forces from the Philadelphi Route.

The Israeli Supreme Court, in response to a settlers' petition to block the government's destruction of the synagogues, gave the go-ahead to the Israeli government. Sharon decided not to proceed with their demolition, however.  On September 11, the Israeli cabinet revised an earlier decision to destroy the synagogues of the settlements. The Palestinian Authority protested Israel's decision, arguing that it would rather Israel dismantle the synagogues. On September 11, a ceremony was held when the last Israeli flag was lowered in the IDF's Gaza Strip divisional headquarters. All remaining IDF forces left the Gaza Strip in the following hours. The last soldier left the strip, and the Kissufim gate was closed on the early morning of September 12. This completed the Israeli pullout from the Gaza Strip. However, an official handover ceremony was cancelled after the Palestinian Authority boycotted it in response to Israel's decision not to demolish the synagogues. On September 20, the IDF temporarily entered the northern Gaza Strip, constructing a buffer zone parallel to the border near Beit Hanoun before pulling out. On September 21, Israel officially declared the Gaza Strip to be an extraterritorial jurisdiction and the four border crossings on the Israel-Gaza border to be international border crossings, with a valid passport or other appropriate travel documents now required to cross through them.

All of the greenhouses in the settlements were supposed to be intact after the Economic Cooperation Foundation raised $14 million to buy the greenhouses for the Palestinian Authority,  although about half of them were previously demolished by their own owners before being evacuated for lack of the agreed payment.

On September 22, the IDF evacuated the four settlements in the northern West Bank. While the residents of Ganim and Kadim, mostly middle-class seculars, had long since left their homes, several families and about 2,000 outsiders tried to prevent the evacuation of Sa-Nur and Homesh, which had a larger percent of observant population. Following negotiations, the evacuation was completed relatively peacefully. The settlements were subsequently razed, with 270 homes being bulldozed. In Sa-Nur, the synagogue was left intact, but was buried under mounds of sand by bulldozers to prevent its destruction by the Palestinians.

During the pullout, hundreds of people were arrested for rioting, and criminal charges were filed against 482 of them. On January 25, 2010, the Knesset passed a bill granting a general amnesty to around 400 of them, mostly teenagers. While most had by then finished serving their sentences, their criminal records were expunged. The people who were not pardoned as part of this amnesty had either been convicted of crimes that involved endangering human life, and involved the use of explosives or serious violence, or had a previous criminal record.

Following Israel's withdrawal, on September 12 Palestinian crowds entered the settlements waving PLO and Hamas flags, firing gunshots into the air and setting off firecrackers, and chanting slogans. Radicals among them desecrated 4 synagogues. Destroyed homes were ransacked. Hamas leaders held celebratory prayers in Kfar Darom synagogue as mobs continued to ransack and loot synagogues. Palestinian Authority security forces did not intervene, and announced that the synagogues would be destroyed. Less than 24 hours after the withdrawal, Palestinian Authority bulldozers began to demolish the remaining synagogues. Hamas took credit for the withdrawal, and one of their banners read: 'Four years of resistance beat ten years of negotiations.'

Greenhouses 
A widespread opinion has it that Israel left Gazans with a generous endowment consisting of a rich infrastructure of greenhouses to assist their economic regrowth, and that this was immediately destroyed by the Palestinians.
Two months prior to the withdrawal, half of the 21 settlements' greenhouses, spread over 1,000 acres, had been dismantled by their owners, leaving the remainder on 500 acres, placing its business viability on a weak footing. International bodies, and pressure from James Wolfensohn, Middle East envoy of the Quartet, who gave $500,000 of his own money, offered incentives for the rest to be left to the Palestinians of Gaza. An agreement was reached with Israel under international law to destroy the settlers' houses and shift the rubble to Egypt. The disposal of asbestos presented a particular problem: some 60,000 truckloads of rubble required passage to Egypt.

The remaining settlements' greenhouses were looted by Palestinians for 2 days after the transfer, for irrigation pipes, water pumps, plastic sheeting and glass, but the greenhouses themselves remained structurally intact, until order was restored. Palestinian Authority security forces attempted to stop them, but were inadequately staffed. In some places, there was no security, while some Palestinian police officers joined the looters. The Palestine Economic Development Company (PED) invested $20,000,000 and by October the industry was back on its feet. Subsequently, the harvest, intended for export via Israel for Europe, was essentially lost due to Israeli restrictions on the Karni crossing which "was closed more than not", leading to losses in excess of $120,000 per day. Economic consultants estimated that the closures cost the whole agricultural sector in Gaza $450,000 a day in lost revenue. 25 truckloads of produce per diem through that crossing were needed to render the project viable, but only rarely were just 3 truckloads able to obtain transit at the crossing, which however functioned only sporadically, with Israel citing security concerns. It appears that on both sides corruption prevailed, such as instances of Gazans negotiating with Israeli officers at the crossing and offering bribes to get their trucks over the border. By early 2006, farmers, faced with the slowness of transit, were forced to dump most of their produce at the crossing where it was eaten by goats. Ariel Sharon fell ill, a new Israeli administration eventually came to power and Wolfensohn resigned his office, after suffering from obstacles placed in his way by the U.S. administration, which was sceptical of the agreements reached on border terminals. Wolfensohn attributed this policy of hindrance to Elliott Abrams. Further complications arose from Hamas's election victory in January 2006, and the rift that emerged between Hamas and Fatah. He attributed the electoral success of Hamas to the frustration felt by Palestinians over the non-implementation of these agreements, which shattered their brief experience of normality. "Instead of hope, the Palestinians saw that they were put back in prison," he concluded.<ref name="Smooha" >Shahar Smooha, 'All the Dreams We Had Are Now Gone' All the dreams we had are now gone',] Haaretz July 19, 2007.</ref> The project was shut down in April 2006 when money ran out to pay the agricultural workers.

 Aftermath 

After Israel's withdrawal, the Palestinians were given control over the Gaza Strip, except for the borders, the airspace and the territorial waters. The area of the dismantled West Bank settlements remained part of Area C (area under full Israeli civil and military control). On September 23, hours after rockets were shot into Israel, a Hamas pickup truck in the Jabaliya refugee camp exploded, killing at least 19 people (both militants and civilians) and injuring 85 people. On September 29, Israel closed all Hamas charities in the West Bank and as part of a five-day offensive fired artillery at targets in the Gaza Strip.

A British Parliamentary commission, summing up the situation eight months later, found that while the Rafah crossing agreement worked efficiently, from January–April 2006, the Karni crossing was closed 45% of the time, and severe limitations were in place on exports from Gaza, with, according to OCHA figures, only 1,500 of 8,500 tons of produce getting through; that they were informed most closures were unrelated to security issues in Gaza but either responses to violence in the West Bank or for no given reason. The promised transit of convoys between Gaza and the West Bank was not honoured; with Israel insisting that such convoys could only pass if they passed through a specially constructed tunnel or ditch, requiring a specific construction project in the future; Israel withdrew from implementation talks in December 2005 after a suicide bombing attack on Israelis in Netanya by a Palestinian from Kafr Rai.

 Compensation and resettlement 

Under legislation passed by the Knesset, evacuated settlers were to be compensated for the loss of their homes, lands, and businesses. Originally, the law only allowed anyone age 21 or over who had lived in one of the evacuated settlements for over five consecutive years to be compensated, but the Israeli Supreme Court ruled that compensation for younger settlers should also be included in compensation payments to evacuated families. Settlers who lived in the area for at least two years were eligible for more money. The Israeli government offered bonuses to settlers who moved to the Galilee or Negev, and implemented a program in which settlers had the option to build their own homes, with the option of a rental grant. The Housing Ministry doubled the number of apartments available in the Negev. Farmers were offered farmland or plots of land on which to build a home, in exchange for reduced compensation. Land was to be compensated at a rate of $50,000 per dunam (approximately $202,000 per acre), with homes being compensated at a rate per square meter. Workers who lost their jobs were eligible for unemployment benefits ranging from minimum wage to twice the average salary, for up to six months. Workers aged 50 to 55 were offered years' worth of unemployment benefits, and those over 55 were eligible for a pension until age 67. A special category was created for communities that moved en masse, with the government funding the replacement of communal buildings. In cases where communities did not stay together and communal property was lost, individuals would receive compensation for donations made to those buildings. Taxes on compensation sums given to business owners were reduced from ten to five percent. The total cost of the compensation package as adopted by the Knesset was 3.8 billion NIS (approximately $870 million). Following an increase in the number of compensation claims after the disengagement, another 1.5 billion NIS (approximately $250 million) was added. In 2007, a further $125 million was added to the compensation budget. Approximately $176 million was to be paid directly to the evacuees, $66 million to private business owners, and the rest was allocated to finance the government's pullout-related expenses. Yitzhak Meron, the lawyer who represented the evacuees, in dealing with the government offices, recently (11.08.2014) described how this came about, as well as his perception of the situation.

According to an Israeli committee of inquiry, the government failed to properly implement its compensation plans. By April 2006, only minimal compensation (approximately $10,000) had been paid to families to survive until they obtained new jobs, which was difficult for most people, considering that most of the newly unemployed were middle-aged and lost the agricultural resources that were their livelihood. Those seeking compensation also had to negotiate legal and bureaucratic hurdles.

This criticism received further support from State Comptroller Micha Lindenstrauss's, report, which determined that the treatment of the evacuees was a "big failure" and pointed out many shortcomings.

By 2007, 56.8% of evacuees had found jobs, 22.3% were unemployed and seeking work, and 31.2% of evacuees were unemployed and living off government benefits rather than seeking work. The average monthly salary among the evacuees was NIS 5,380 (about $1,281), a slight rise of 2.1 percent from the average salary the year before. This was, however, a sharp drop of 39% from the settlers' average monthly income before the disengagement. The average salary among evacuees was lower than the general average, as compared to above average before the disengagement. In addition to a drop in salary, the evacuees also suffered a drop in their standard of living due to the increased price of goods and services in their places of residence as compared to the settlements.
Following the disengagement, settlers were temporarily relocated to hotels, sometimes for as long as half a year, before moving to mobile homes as temporary housing known as 'caravillas', before they could build proper homes. By June 2014, about 60% of evacuees were still living in these caravillas. Only 40% had moved to permanent housing, although construction of permanent settlements for the evacuees continues to progress. By July 2014, eleven towns for the evacuees had been completed with the expellees joining ten additional towns. Many of the permanent settlements under construction were given names reminiscent of the former Gaza settlements. By August 2014, unemployment among evacuees had dropped to 18%. In 2010 a bill was introduced in the Knesset providing a basic pension to business owners whose businesses collapsed.

New Gush Katif Communities
Bustan HaGalil
Neve Yam new community
Avnei Eitan
Maskiot
Netzer, new neighborhood in Ariel
Netzer Hazani new community
Palmachim
Yad Binyamin
Nitzan
Be'er Ganim new community
Hertzog new neighborhood in Ashkelon
Ganei Tal new community
Karmei Katif new community
Bnei Dekalim new community
Neta new community in Tel Katifa
Shomriya new community
Teneh Omarim
Bat Hadar
Mavki'im
Talmei Yafeh
Shavei Darom new community
Naveh new community
Bnei Netzarim new community

 Fatah–Hamas conflict 

Following the withdrawal, Hamas was elected as the Palestinian government which started the chain reaction leading to Operation "Summer Rains"  later within that year.

In December 2006, news reports indicated that a number of Palestinians were leaving the Gaza Strip, due to political disorder and "economic pressure" there. In January 2007, fighting continued between Hamas and Fatah, without any progress towards resolution or reconciliation. Fighting spread to several points in the Gaza Strip with both factions attacking each other. In response to constant attacks by rocket fire from the Gaza Strip, Israel launched an airstrike which destroyed a building used by Hamas. In June 2007 the Fatah–Hamas conflict reached its height and Hamas took control over the Gaza Strip.

Museum
In August 2008, a museum of Gush Katif opened in Jerusalem near Machane Yehuda. Yankeleh Klein, the museum director, sees it as an artistic commemoration of the expulsion from the 21 Gaza settlements, and the evacuees' longing to return. The art displayed in the museum is that of Gaza evacuees along with pieces by photographers and artists who were involved in the disengagement or were affected by it.

In the newly renovated Katif Center, more properly called the "Gush Katif Heritage Center in Nitzan," Israel, they combine modern technology with guided tours by Gush Katif expellees to provide a very emotional experience. Project Coordinator Laurence Beziz notes that. "Our goal is to tell the story of 35 years of pioneering the land of Israel in Gush Katif and to allow an insight as to what life was in Gush Katif."

 Criticisms and opinions 

The unilateral disengagement plan has been criticized from various viewpoints. In Israel, it has been criticized by the settlers themselves, supported by the Israeli right, who saw Ariel Sharon's action as a betrayal of his previous policies of support of settlement. Conversely, the disengagement has been criticized by parts of the Israeli left, who viewed it as nothing more than a mode of stalling negotiations and increasing Israeli presence in the West Bank. The disengagement also did not address wider issues of occupation. Israel retained control over Gaza's borders, airspace, coastline, infrastructure, power, import-exports, etc.

Pro-withdrawal
The Disengagement Plan was also criticized by both Israelis and other observers from the opposite viewpoint as an attempt to make permanent the different settlements of the West Bank, while the Gaza strip was rendered to the Palestinian National Authority as an economically uninteresting territory with a Muslim population of nearly 1.4 million, seen as a "threat" to the Jewish identity of the Israeli democratic state. As Leila Shahid, speaker of the PNA in Europe declared, the sole fact of carrying out the plan unilaterally already showed that the plan was only thought of according to the objectives of Israel as viewed by Sharon. Brian Cowen, Irish Foreign Minister and speaker of the European Union (EU), announced the EU's disapproval of the plan's limited scope in that it did not address withdrawal from the entire West Bank. He said that the EU "will not recognize any change to the pre-1967 borders other than those arrived at by agreement between the parties." However, Europe has given tentative backing to the Disengagement plan as part of the road map for peace. Critics pointed out that, at the same time that Sharon was preparing the withdrawal, he was favoring settlements in the West Bank, among them Ma'ale Adumim, the largest Israeli settlement near Jerusalem. According to Peace Now, the number of settlers increased by 6,100 compared with 2004, to reach 250,000 in the West Bank. In an October 6, 2004, interview with Haaretz, Dov Weissglass, Sharon's chief of staff, declared:
"The significance of the disengagement plan is the freezing of the peace process.... When you freeze that process, you prevent the establishment of a Palestinian state and you prevent a discussion on the refugees, the borders and Jerusalem. Disengagement supplies the amount of formaldehyde that is necessary so there will not be a political process with the Palestinians."

Positions of foreign governments

United States
President George W. Bush endorsed the plan as a positive step towards the road map for peace. At a joint press conference with Ariel Sharon on April 11, 2005 he said:
 I strongly support [Prime Minister Sharon's] courageous initiative to disengage from Gaza and part of the West Bank. The Prime Minister is willing to coordinate the implementation of the disengagement plan with the Palestinians. I urge the Palestinian leadership to accept his offer. By working together, Israelis and Palestinians can lay the groundwork for a peaceful transition. 

And in his May 26, 2005, joint press conference welcoming Palestinian leader Mahmoud Abbas to the White House, President George W. Bush elaborated:
The imminent Israeli disengagement from Gaza, parts of the West Bank, presents an opportunity to lay the groundwork for a return to the road map.... To help ensure that the Gaza disengagement is a success, the United States will provide to the Palestinian Authority $50 million to be used for new housing and infrastructure projects in the Gaza.
 

On April 11, 2005, President George W. Bush stated:
 As part of a final peace settlement, Israel must have secure and recognized borders, which should emerge from negotiations between the parties in accordance with UNSC Resolutions 242 and 338. In light of new realities on the ground, including already existing major Israeli population centers, it is unrealistic that the outcome of final status negotiations will be a full and complete return to the armistice lines of 1949. 

In his May 26, 2005 joint press conference with Palestinian leader Mahmoud Abbas, in the White House Rose Garden, President George W. Bush stated his expectations vis-a-vis the Roadmap Plan as follows:
Any final status agreement must be reached between the two parties, and changes to the 1949 Armistice lines must be mutually agreed to. A viable two-state solution must ensure contiguity of the West Bank, and a state of scattered territories will not work. There must also be meaningful linkages between the West Bank and Gaza. This is the position of the United States today, it will be the position of the United States at the time of final status negotiations. 

European Union
Javier Solana, High Representative for the Common Foreign and Security Policy (CFSP), stated on June 10, 2004:
I welcome the Israeli Prime Minister's proposals for disengagement from Gaza. This represents an opportunity to restart the implementation of the Road Map, as endorsed by the UN Security Council.

The Irish Minister for Foreign Affairs, Brian Cowen (Ireland having Presidency of the EU at the time), announced the European Union's disapproval of the plan's limited scope in that it does not address withdrawal from the entire West Bank. He said that the EU "will not recognize any change to the pre-1967 borders other than those arrived at by agreement between the parties." However, Europe has given tentative backing to the Disengagement Plan as part of the road map for peace.

United Nations
Kofi Annan, United Nations Secretary-General, commended on August 18, 2005 what he called Israeli Prime Minister Sharon's "courageous decision" to carry through with the painful process of disengagement, expressed the hope that "both Palestinians and Israelis will exercise restraint in this challenging period", and "believes that a successful disengagement should be the first step towards a resumption of the peace process, in accordance with the Road Map", referring to the plan sponsored by the diplomatic Quartet – UN, EU, Russia, and the United States – which calls for a series of parallel steps leading to two states living side-by-side in peace by the end of the year.

Ibrahim Gambari, Under-Secretary-General for Political Affairs, told the Security Council on August 24, 2005:Israel has demonstrated that it has the requisite maturity to do what would be required to achieve lasting peace, and the Israeli Defence Forces (IDF) has demonstrated their ability to discharge their mission with carefully calibrated restraint. Prime Minister Sharon should be commended for his determination and courage to carry out the disengagement in the face of forceful and strident internal opposition.

Public opinion

Palestinian
The PA, in the absence of a final peace settlement, has welcomed any military withdrawal from the territories, but many Palestinian Arabs have objected to the plan, stating that it aims to "bypass" past international agreements, and instead call for a complete withdrawal from the West Bank and Gaza Strip. Their suspicions were further aroused when top Sharon aide Dov Weisglass was quoted in an interview with Israeli newspaper Haaretz on October 6, 2004, as saying that the disengagement would prevent a Palestinian state for years to come (see above).  This incident has bolstered the position of critics of the plan that Sharon is intentionally trying to scuttle the peace process. Israeli officials, including Weisglass, denied this accusation, and media critics have asserted that the Weisglass interview was widely distorted and taken out of context.

On August 8, 2005, Haaretz quoted a top Palestinian Authority religious cleric, Sheikh Jamal al-Bawatna, the mufti of the Ramallah district, in a fatwa (a religious edict) banning shooting attacks against Israeli security forces and settlements, out of concern they might lead to a postponement of the pullout. According to Haaretz, this is the first time that a Muslim cleric has forbidden shooting at Israeli forces.

On August 15, 2005, scenes of delight took place across the Arab world, following the long-ingrained suspicion that the disengagement would not take place.

Israeli opinions

A September 15, 2004 survey published in Maariv showed that:
69% supported a general referendum to decide on the plan; 26% thought that approval in the Knesset would be enough.
If a referendum were to be held, 58% would vote for the disengagement plan, while 29% would vote against it.

Polls on support for the plan have consistently shown support for the plan in the 50–60% range, and opposition in the 30–40% range. A June 9, 2005, Dahaf Institute/Yedioth Ahronoth poll showed support for the plan at 53%, and opposition at 38%. A June 17, telephone poll published in Maariv'' showed 54% of Israel's Jews supporting the plan. A poll carried out by the Midgam polling company, on June 29 found support at 48% and opposition at 41%, but a Dahaf Institute/Yedioth Ahronot poll of the same day found support at 62% and opposition at 31%. A poll conducted the week of July 17 by the Tel Aviv University Institute for Media, Society, and Politics shows that Israeli approval of the disengagement is at 48%;  43% of the respondents believe that Palestinian terrorism will increase following disengagement, versus 25% who believe that terrorism will decline.

On July 25, 2004, the "Human Chain", a rally of tens of thousands of Israelis to protest against the plan and for a national referendum took place. The protestors formed a human chain from Nisanit (later moved to Erez Crossing because of security concerns) in the Gaza Strip to the Western Wall in Jerusalem a distance of 90 km. On October 14, 2004, 100,000 Israelis marched in cities throughout Israel to protest the plan under the slogan "100 cities support Gush Katif and Samaria".

On May 16, 2005, a nonviolent protest was held throughout the country, with the protesters blocking major traffic arteries throughout Israel. The protest was sponsored by "HaBayit HaLeumi", and was hailed by them as a success, with over 400 protestors arrested, half of them juveniles. Over 40 intersections throughout the country were blocked, including:
The entrance to Jerusalem
Bar Ilan/Shmuel Hanavi Junction in Jerusalem
Sultan's Pool Junction outside the Old City of Jerusalem
Geha Highway
Golumb St. corner of Begin Blvd in Jerusalem

On June 9, 2005, a poll on Israeli Channel 2 showed that public support for the plan had fallen below 50 percent for the first time.

On July 18, 2005, a nonviolent protest was held. The protest began in Netivot near Gaza. The protest march ended July 21 after police prevented protesters from continuing to Gush Katif. On August 2, 2005, another protest against disengagement began in Sderot, with approximately 50,000 attendees. On August 10, 2005, in response to calls from Jewish religious leaders, including former Chief Rabbis Avraham Shapira, Ovadia Yosef, and Mordechai Eliyahu, between 70,000 (police estimate) and 250,000 (organizers' estimate) Jews gathered for a rally centered at the Western Wall in prayer to ask that the planned disengagement be cancelled. The crowds that showed up for the rally overwhelmed the Western Wall's capacity and extended as far as the rest of the Old City and surrounding Jerusalem neighborhoods. The prayer rally was the largest of its kind for over 15 years, since the opposition to the Madrid Conference of 1991. On August 11, 2005, between 150,000 (police estimates) and 300,000 (organizers' estimates) people massed in and around Tel Aviv's Rabin Square for an anti-disengagement rally. Organizers called the event "the largest expression of public protest ever held in Israel."  According to a police spokesman, it was one of the largest rallies in recent memory.

Those advocating suspension or cancellation of the plan have often quoted one or more of these arguments:

The religious approach maintains that Eretz Israel was promised to the Jews by God, and that no government has the authority to waive this inalienable right. In their view, inhabiting all of the land of Israel is one of the most important mitzvot.
The political approach, owing much to existing right-wing ideology, claims that the areas to be evacuated constitute Israeli territory as legitimately as Tel Aviv or Haifa, and that relocating settlers is illegal and violates their human rights. Some have gone as far as labelling it a war crime. In the wake of the Sharm el-Sheikh Summit of February 2005, some have claimed that now that there is a negotiation partner on the Palestinian side, the plan has become redundant.
The military approach says that the plan is disastrous to Israeli security – not only will prevention of Qassam rockets and other attacks from Gaza become nearly impossible after the withdrawal, but implementation of the plan will be an important moral victory for Hamas and other organizations, and will encourage them to continue executing terrorist attacks against Israel.

Orange ribbons in Israel symbolize opposition to the disengagement; it is the color of the flag of the Gaza coast Regional Council. Blue ribbons (sometimes blue-and-white ribbons) symbolized support for the disengagement and are intended to invoke the Israeli flag.

American opinions
Polls in the U.S. about the question of the Gaza pullout produced varied results. One poll commissioned by the Anti-Defamation League, and conducted by the Marttila Communications Group from June 19–23, 2005 among 2200 American adults, found that 71% of respondents felt that the Disengagement Plan is closer to a "bold step that would advance the Peace Process" than to a "capitulation to terrorist violence", while 12% felt that the plan is more of a "capitulation" than a "bold step".

Another poll commissioned by the Zionist Organization of America, and conducted by McLaughlin & Associates on June 26, 2005 – June 27, 2005, with a sample of 1,000 American adults, showed U.S. opposition to the proposed disengagement. Respondents, by a margin of 4 to 1 (63% to 16%) opposed "Israel’s unilateral withdrawal from a section of Gaza and northern Samaria and forcing 10,000 Israeli Jews from their homes and businesses" and by a margin of 2.5 to 1 (53% to 21%), agreed with the statement that "this Gaza Plan sends a message that Arab terrorism is being rewarded."

Morton Klein, President of the Zionist Organization of America, criticized the Anti-Defamation League-commissioned poll, stating that the question in the poll was not whether or not respondents agreed with the Disengagement Plan, but was a subjective characterization of primary motives behind it: whether Israeli politicians are acting more for the sake of capitulating to terrorism or for the sake of continuing the road map. The Anti-Defamation League, in turn, criticized the ZOA-commissioned poll, calling its wording "loaded."

Israeli media coverage
The Israeli media systematically overstated "the threat posed by those opposed to disengagement and emphasiz[ed] extreme scenarios", according to the Israeli media monitoring NGO Keshev ("Awareness").  Keshev's report states that 

Based on Keshev's research, the Israeli print and TV media "relegated to back pages and buried deep in the newscasts, often under misleading headlines" items that "mitigat[ed] the extreme forecasts." Editors delivered "one dominant, ominous message: The Police Declares High Alert Starting Tomorrow, Almost Like a State of War" Channel 1 (main news headline, August 14, 2005)

"The discrepancy between the relatively calm reality emerging from most stories and the overall picture reflected in the headlines is evident in every aspect of the disengagement story: in the suppression of information about the voluntary collection of weapons held by the settlers in the Gaza Strip; in reporting exaggerated numbers of right-wing protesters who infiltrated the Strip before the evacuation; in misrepresentation of the purpose of settler protest (which was an exercise in public relations, not a true attempt to thwart the disengagement plan); and in playing down coordinated efforts between the Israeli security forces and the settlers."

The price for this misrepresentation was paid, at least in part, by the settlers, whose public image was radicalized unjustifiably. After the disengagement was completed without violence between Israelis and a sense of unity and pride pervaded society, "the media chose to give Israeli society, and especially its security forces, a pat on the back."

See also
Homesh First
Jordan's disengagement from the West Bank
Palestinian rocket attacks on Israel
Realignment plan
Unsettled

References

Bibliography
 has

External links

Official documents
The Cabinet Resolution Regarding the Disengagement Plan, Revised Disengagement Plan – Main Principles. Israel MFA, June 6, 2004
PM Sharon's Statement on the Day of the Implementation of the Disengagement Plan from the Israeli Prime Minister's Office
Israel's Disengagement Plan: Renewing the Peace Process Official website from the Israel Ministry of Foreign affairs.
Jan 2005.htm Israel's Disengagement Plan: Selected Documents Official website from the Israel Ministry of Foreign affairs.
Ariel Sharon's Disengagement Plan and President Bush's letter accepting it at MidEastWeb for Coexistence
Map of disengagement plan showing settlements to be evacuated at MidEastWeb for Coexistence
Map

News reports and commentary
Pictures of the Mass Prayer Rally against the disengagement plan at the Western Wall in Jerusalem
Pictures of the Mass Rally in Tel Aviv against the disengagement plan
Ariel Sharon's Disengagement Plan – From Ariel Sharon's Life Story – A biography

 
Israeli–Palestinian peace process
Forced migration
Politics of Israel
2005 in Israel
2005 in the Palestinian territories
Military withdrawals
2005 in the Gaza Strip